Dmitriy Vladimirovich Lyapkin (born 16 September 1976) is a Kazakh former football defender.

Lyapkin has made 15 appearances for the Kazakhstan national football team since 2004.

References

External links
 
  Player page on the official FC Baltika Kaliningrad website

1976 births
People from Shymkent
Living people
Kazakhstani footballers
Kazakhstani expatriate footballers
Association football defenders
Kazakhstan international footballers
FC Tekstilshchik Kamyshin players
FC Elista players
FC Saturn Ramenskoye players
FC Zhenis Astana players
FC Baltika Kaliningrad players
FC Khimki players
FC Sokol Saratov players
Russian Premier League players
Expatriate footballers in Russia
PFC CSKA Moscow players
FC Lokomotiv Moscow players